Ephedra californica is a species of Ephedra, known by the common names California jointfir, California ephedra, desert tea, Mormon tea, and cañatillo.

Distribution
The plant is native to many diverse areas of central and southern California, Baja California, and west Arizona. It grows in varied scrub and open habitats, including chaparral, arid grassland, and Creosote scrub.

Regions and landforms of distribution include:
Mojave Desert
Sonoran Desert
Colorado Desert
Peninsular Ranges
Transverse Ranges
Tehachapi Mountains
Southern Sierra Nevada foothills
San Joaquin Valley
South California Coast Ranges
Channel Islands
Southern California coastal basins (undeveloped habitats)

Habitats include:
California chaparral and woodlands
California coastal sage and chaparral ecoregion
California montane chaparral and woodlands ecoregion
California interior chaparral and woodlands

Description
Ephedra californica is a spindly shrub made up of twigs which are greenish when new and age to a yellowish-gray color and have fine longitudinal grooves on their surfaces. The bark becomes gray-brown, and irregularly fissured and cracked. It grows  in height, with similar spread.

The tiny leaves grow at nodes on the twigs and dry in drought, to crumble away to leave brownish ridges there.

Native American uses
Ephedra californica was used by the indigenous peoples of California as a medicinal plant, culinary ingredient, and for making tools. Tribal people using it included the Kumeyaay—Diegueño and Kawaiisu of present-day Southern California. The branches of the Ephedra californica were frequently brewed for its medicinal properties. The Kumeyaay used the tea of the Ephedra californica to cleanse the blood and kidneys and as an appetite suppressant.

References

External links

Jepson Manual Treatment: Ephedra californica (desert tea)
Flora of North America @ efloras.org: Ephedra californica
USDA Plants Profile — Ephedra californica (California jointfir)
Ephedra californica — U.C. Photo gallery

californica
Flora of California
Flora of Baja California
Flora of Arizona
Flora of the California desert regions
Flora of the Sierra Nevada (United States)
Flora of the Sonoran Deserts
Natural history of the California chaparral and woodlands
Natural history of the Channel Islands of California
Natural history of the Central Valley (California)
Natural history of the Colorado Desert
Natural history of the Mojave Desert
Natural history of the Peninsular Ranges
Natural history of the Santa Monica Mountains
Natural history of the Transverse Ranges
Plants used in traditional Native American medicine